The Lone Prairie is a 1942 American Western film directed by William Berke. It is one of a series of Westerns that Berke directed with the trio of Russell Hayden, Dub Taylor, and Bob Wills. It was produced and distributed by Columbia Pictures.

Cast 
 Russell Hayden as Lucky Dawson
 Dub Taylor as Cannonball
 Bob Wills as Bob
 Ernie Adams as Judge Barstow
 Sandy Guymon as Bill Slade
 Kermit Maynard as Henchman 
 The Texas Playboys

External links 
 

1942 films
1942 Western (genre) films
American Western (genre) films
1940s English-language films
American black-and-white films
Columbia Pictures films
Films directed by William A. Berke
1940s American films